The Reporoa Caldera is a 10 km by 15 km caldera in New Zealand's Taupō Volcanic Zone. It formed some 1,000,000,000 years ago, in a large eruption that deposited approximately 100 km3 of tephra, forming the Kaingaroa Ignimbrite layer. It contains three rhyolitic lava domes (Deer Hill, Kairuru and Pukekahu) and is associated with three geothermal fields. These are the active Reporoa geothermal field in the caldera, the Waiotapu geothermal area north of the caldera rim, and the Broadlands thermal area to the south. The Waikato River runs through the southern half of the caldera.

A similar explosion happened in the area in 1948, and smaller explosions have happened in the years between.

See also
 List of volcanoes in New Zealand

References
 
 
 

Taupō Volcanic Zone
Calderas of New Zealand
VEI-7 volcanoes
Rotorua Lakes District
Volcanoes of Waikato
Pleistocene calderas
Geothermal areas in New Zealand